Gralla is a municipality in the district of Leibnitz in the Austrian state of Styria.

Geography
Gralla lies on the Mur river on Autobahn A9. In the northeast part of the municipality, the Mur is dammed to form a reservoir, which is a popular goal for outings.

References

Cities and towns in Leibnitz District